Gynaikothrips is a genus of tube-tailed thrips in the family Phlaeothripidae. There are more than 30 described species in Gynaikothrips.

Species
These 35 species belong to the genus Gynaikothrips:

 Gynaikothrips additamentus Karny
 Gynaikothrips australis Bagnall
 Gynaikothrips brevisetis Priesner
 Gynaikothrips chavicae Karny
 Gynaikothrips citricornis Moulton, 1928
 Gynaikothrips ebneri Karny, 1920
 Gynaikothrips ficorum (Marchal, 1908) (Cuban laurel thrips)
 Gynaikothrips fumipennis Karny
 Gynaikothrips fuscipes Karny, 1922
 Gynaikothrips garitacambroneroi Retana-Salazar, 2006
 Gynaikothrips gracilis Karny
 Gynaikothrips hirsutus
 Gynaikothrips hopkinsi Bagnall
 Gynaikothrips hystrix Bagnall
 Gynaikothrips imitans Karny
 Gynaikothrips imitator Ananthakrishnan
 Gynaikothrips insulsus Priesner, 1939
 Gynaikothrips karnyi Bagnall
 Gynaikothrips litoralis Karny
 Gynaikothrips longiceps Karny
 Gynaikothrips longicornis Karny, 1915
 Gynaikothrips luzonensis Priesner
 Gynaikothrips messuicola Bagnall
 Gynaikothrips mikaniae Priesner
 Gynaikothrips obscuripes Bagnall
 Gynaikothrips pallipes Karny
 Gynaikothrips piperis Priesner
 Gynaikothrips pontis Reyes, 1996
 Gynaikothrips satanas Priesner
 Gynaikothrips scotti Bagnall
 Gynaikothrips simillimus Karny, 1916
 Gynaikothrips sulcifrons Ananthakrishnan
 Gynaikothrips tristis Karny, 1915
 Gynaikothrips uzeli (Zimmermann, 1900)
 Gynaikothrips williamsi Karny

References

Further reading

 
 
 
 
 
 
 

Phlaeothripidae
Articles created by Qbugbot